Floral is an unincorporated community in Cowley County, Kansas, United States.

History
Floral had a post office from 1870 until 1932.

Floral was a shipping point on the St. Louis–San Francisco Railway.

Education
The community is served by Winfield USD 465 public school district.

References

Further reading

External links
 Cowley County maps: Current, Historic, KDOT

Unincorporated communities in Cowley County, Kansas
Unincorporated communities in Kansas